Stegaspidinae is a subfamily of treehoppers in the family Membracidae.

Genera
These genera are members of the subfamily Stegaspidinae:

 Antillotolania Ramos, 1957 c g
 Bocydium Latreille, 1829 c g
 Centruchoides Fowler, 1896 c g
 Deiroderes Ramos, 1957 c g
 Flexocentrus Goding, 1926 c g
 Glischrocentrus Fowler, 1896 c g
 Lirania Stål, 1860 c g
 Lycoderes Germar, 1835 c g
 Microcentrus Stal, 1869 c g b
 Oeda Amyot & Audinet-Serville, 1843 c g
 Smerdalea Fowler, 1896 c g
 Stegaspis Germar, 1833 c g
 Stylocentrus Stål, 1869 c g
 Tumecauda Goding, 1930 c g
 Umbelligerus Deitz, 1975 c g

Data sources: i = ITIS, c = Catalogue of Life, g = GBIF, b = Bugguide.net

References

Further reading

External links

 

 
Membracidae